Plougasnou is a commune in the Finistère department in Brittany in northwestern France, located about 75 kilometres east of Brest. Plougasnou is northeast of the town of Plouezoc'h, north of Lanmeur and west of Saint-Jean-du-Doigt. It had a population of 3,197 inhabitants in 2016. Inhabitants of Plougasnou are called Plouganistes.

Population

Twinning 
Plougasnou has been twinned with Helston since 2010.

See also
Communes of the Finistère department

References

External links

Official website 

Mayors of Finistère Association 

Communes of Finistère
Seaside resorts in France